Cookeville is the county seat and largest city of Putnam County, Tennessee, United States. As of the 2020 United States census, its population was reported to be 34,842. It is recognized as one of the country's micropolitan areas, or smaller cities which function as significant regional economic hubs. Of the twenty micropolitan areas in Tennessee, Cookeville is the largest. The Cookeville micropolitan area's 2010 Census population was 106,042.  The U.S. Census Bureau ranked the Cookeville micropolitan area as the 7th largest-gaining micropolitan area in the country between 2018 and 2019, with a one-year gain of 1,796 and a 2019 population of 114,272. The city is a college town, home to Tennessee Tech.

History

Early years and establishment
Previous to its settlement era, the area of Cookeville was dominated by the Cherokee Native American tribe through the Paleo-Indian to the early European colonization periods of history. The Cherokee would use the region as communal hunting grounds. Claims to the land by the Cherokee in the Cumberland Plateau would cease following the signing of the third rendition of the Treaty of Tellico in October 1805. The area surrounding Cookeville and Putnam County was first reported to be settled by Virginia and North Carolina longhunters around the late 1700s to early 1800s, most of whom were of English and Scotch-Irish descent. Settlers arrived by Avery's Trace, which was known as the Walton Road in the area of what is present-day Cookeville. Putnam County was not established until 1842, when it was formed from portions of White, Overton, Jackson, Smith, and DeKalb counties after the population increased sufficiently, straining those counties' abilities to support services to the isolated residents. Entering the 19th century, the area was dominated economically with the rise of agriculture, logging, and timber production. Putnam County re-established itself in 1854, with the establishment of a county seat required by new Tennessee state law. In the same year, land purchased by Charles Crook would become the area where the new county seat would be established since it has access to a natural springs able to support a town. The city was named Cookeville for Richard Fielding Cooke, an early pioneer who came to Tennessee in 1810 and settled in the area.  Cooke was twice elected to the state senate, and was influential in establishing Putnam County in 1854.

Antebellum and Civil War era
The largely rugged landscape of the Cookeville area made it unsuitable for large-scale farming operations compared to most of the larger Middle Tennessee region. Despite this, several farming institutions operated in the region, some using African slave laborers. Following Tennessee's secession from the United States in 1861, residents of the Cookeville area were conflicted on siding in the American Civil War. Most residents opposed secession and wished to remain with the Union. Cookeville residents enrolled to assist in both the armies of the Confederacy and the Union. Several aggressions occurred during the Civil War, including the burning of the Putnam County Courthouse in Cookeville's city square, the slaying of 20 and capture of 40 Confederate soldiers by Union Army Colonel Henry McConnell, and the Battle of Dug Hill.

Economic and cultural growth in Cookeville stagnated as a result of political divide amongst residents's viewpoints on the Civil War, causing animosities amongst neighbors and families. The tides would turn by the late 1800s, following the completion of the city's first hotel, the Isbell in 1886, and the Nashville and Knoxville Railroad four years later.

20th century
The investment made by railroad companies would place Cookeville on a path of massive economic and industrial development with the Nashville and Knoxville railroad, which became the Tennessee Central Railroad. With this new growth, Cookeville would officially incorporate into a chartered city in 1903. Two years later, the city would establish the Cookeville Light and Water Department, when electricity was first distributed in the city. In 1909, the Tennessee Central Railroad would construct the Cookeville Depot in the city's West Side District, providing passenger rail service until 1955.

In 1909, local religious leaders with the aid of the Tennessee state government would establish the University of Dixie, a private university deeded to the community. However, the institution would be seized by the state government in 1915 following decline in enrollment and financial support. The state government would re-establish it into Tennessee Polytechnic Institute, a public institute of technology focused on education in science, technology, engineering, and mathematics. The university would establish Cookeville as a regional education hub and a college town, increasing its population and post-secondary education enrollment. In 1965, it would be renamed Tennessee Technological University.

With the advancement rail access, Cookeville began to industrialize with the rise of textile manufacturing, coal mining, and the rapid expansion of the established timber production industry. The dominance of the railroad declined by the beginnings of the Great Depression. By 1930, U.S. Route 70, the first modern highway in Cookeville, would be completed by the Tennessee Department of Highways, prompting further expansion of Cookeville's industrial and commercial markets. The large-scale Center Hill Dam project by the United States Army Corps of Engineers would provide employment opportunities to Cookeville residents, and after its completion, provided advanced electricity production for industrial development, flood control of the nearby Caney Fork River, and recreational sites with the design of Edgar Evins and Burgess Falls state parks.

Other infrastructure additions to the city would be beneficial to the city's growth, including a water treatment plant in 1946, the Cookeville General Hospital in 1950, and a wastewater treatment plant in 1952.

During the Jim Crow era of the 1950s, John's Place was one business where white and black locals often socialized despite their differences. John's Place was originally opened as Ed's Place in 1949, and later known as McClellan's Cafe, and finally as John's Place starting since 1957, the establishment at 11 Gibson Ave. off of West Spring Street was a grocery store and restaurant. John's Place is known for its southern cuisine – fried chicken, catfish, meatloaf, and corn bread, as well as beer. Throughout the segregation of the 1960s, the only place you could interact interracially was at John's Place, and many locals encountered their first African American at the restaurant. John's Place was listed on the National Register of Historic Places in 2011.

By 1966, the Interstate 40 corridor was completed south of the city center, prompting annexation of several of the freeway's interchanges for commercial development. After its end of passenger rail use in 1955, the Cookeville Depot fell into disrepair. A group of local residents and preservationists would work for the saving of the depot from demolition. After the lengthy demanding from residents, the Cookeville city government would purchase the Cookeville Depot. The citizens group responsible for its preservation restored the facility and reopened it into a museum in 1985, the year it was listed on the National Register of Historic Places.

By the 1970 census, the population of Cookeville would increase by more than 80% compared to the 1960 census, showcasing its rise from a predominately rural town into a larger hub city with increased enrollment at Tennessee Technological University and Interstate 40 positioning the city for increased employment opportunities.

The city's establishment as the economic hub of the Upper Cumberland region strengthened with the construction and completion of Tennessee State Route 111, also known as Appalachian Development Highway System Corridor J. Corridor J, which went through the engineering phase in 1978, and completed in the late 1980s, provides expressway-grade access to Cookeville for neighboring communities in Overton and White counties.

Throughout the 1990s, the Cookeville Public Works and Engineering Department constructed several collector streets that aided with commercial development along the northern side of the I-40 corridor in the city.

Modern day

With the dawn of the 21st century, Cookeville embarked on one of its recorded largest expansions of its city limits, when it would annex over 10 square miles of previously unincorporated Putnam County between 2000 and 2009. In 2007, city officials approved the purchase of over 400 acres for a regional industrial park known as the Highlands Business Park. Cookeville General Hospital, then recently renamed the Cookeville Regional Medical Center, completed a major renovation and expansion project as a result of the city and surrounding region's extensive population growth one year later.

During the March 2020 tornado outbreak, an EF-4 tornado touched down west of Cookeville damaging several of the city's western outskirt neighborhoods, killing 19 people, injuring 87, and causing more than $100 million in damages. As a result of the tornado, Tennessee Tech closed for two days, encouraging students volunteers to assist first responders in rescue and clean-up. The tornado's estimated maximum wind speed of 175 mph along its nearly nine-mile path was recorded as the strongest storm of the outbreak.

Geography

Located on the Highland Rim, Cookeville's elevation (1100 ft AMSL) is a few hundred feet higher than either Nashville or Knoxville. As a result, temperatures and humidity levels are generally slightly lower in Cookeville than in either the Nashville Basin or in the Tennessee Valley.

Cookeville is situated in the Upper Cumberland region of Tennessee near the crossroads of I-40, SR 136, and US 70N-SR 24. The city is located 79 miles east of Nashville and 101 miles west of Knoxville.

Three man-made lakes maintained by the Corps of Engineers are located near Cookeville, created to help flood control in the narrow valleys of the Cumberland Plateau: Center Hill Lake, Cordell Hull Lake, and Dale Hollow Lake.  Two smaller man-made lakes, City Lake and Burgess Falls Lake, lie along the Falling Water River, which flows through the southeastern part of the county.  Cane Creek Lake, created by an earthen dam built by the Civilian Conservation Corps, lies in the western part of the city.

Climate
Cookeville has a humid subtropical climate (Köppen climate classification: Cfa) with relatively high temperatures and evenly distributed precipitation through the year. Summers are typically hot and humid and winters are mild and cool.

Demographics

2020 census

As of the 2020 United States census, there were 34,842 people, 13,743 households, and 7,341 families residing in the city.

2010 census
As of the census of 2010, there were 30,435 people, 12,471 households, and 6,669 families residing in the city. The population density was 1,094.5 people per square mile (422.5/km2). There were 13,706 housing units at an average density of 491.6 per square mile (189.8/km2). The racial makeup of the city was 87.9% White, 3.4% African American, 0.6% Native American, 2.0% Asian, 0.21% Pacific Islander, 4.0% from other races, and 2.1% from two or more races. Hispanic or Latino of any race were 7.0% of the population.

There were 12,471 households, out of which 25.2% had children under the age of 18 living with them, 37% were married couples living together, 12% had a female householder with no husband present, and 46.5% were non-families. Of all households 33.9% were made up of individuals, and 10.9% had someone living alone who was 65 years of age or older. The average household size was 2.19 and the average family size was 2.83.

In the city, the population was spread out, with 18.6% under the age of 18, 25.2% from 18 to 24, 25.1% from 25 to 44, 18.0% from 45 to 64, and 13.7% who were 65 years of age or older. The median age was 29 years. For every 100 females, there were 101.4 males. For every 100 females age 18 and over, there were 100.8 males.

The median income for a household in the city was $29,789, and the median income for a family was $39,623. Males had a median income of $28,013 versus $21,710 for females. The per capita income for the city was $19,297. About 13.1% of families and 23.2% of the population were below the poverty line, including 20.1% of those under age 18 and 18.7% of those age 65 or over.

Economy

Cookeville is the largest city in the Upper Cumberland region of Tennessee, and as such, is known as the "Hub of the Upper Cumberlands." Cookeville is located at the center of the labor market area consisting of Putnam, Cumberland, DeKalb, Jackson, Overton, Smith and White counties, with a civilian labor force in 2013 of 103,500 jobs (roughly one-third of which are in Putnam County itself). , there were 16 commercial banks and four credit unions operating in the city, with combined deposits totaling over $2.5 billion. Total retail sales in Cookeville for 2016 were $1.6 billion.  The unemployment rate  in Putnam County was 3.0%, down from April 2017's rate of 3.7%. The cost of living in Cookeville is low, and the city ranked 8th in the United States on the Center for Regional Economic Competitivess Cost of Living Index in 2016.

Top employers
According to the city's 2030 Comprehensive Annual Plan published in 2010, the top employers in the city in 2009 were:

Manufacturing 

Manufacturing is the largest sector in Cookeville's economy with over 100 plants and 8,000 employees. With 13% of the workforce, retail trade employs about 4,200 people and is the second largest sector in the Cookeville economy. Health care workers comprise about 12% of the work force with 3,840 employees. Education is another major sector with nearly 2,000 employees at Tennessee Tech and the public school system.
 
There are a number of companies based in Cookeville. In 2006 Oreck manufacturing moved their Long Beach, Mississippi plant to Cookeville after Hurricane Katrina. Oreck employs about 500 people and is a prominent business in the region. The trucking company Averitt Express is based in Cookeville, as is J&S Construction. The manufacturing company ATC Automation is also based in Cookeville, and in 2016 announced a $10.4 million investment plan intended to add 110 engineering jobs to the city.  Later in 2016, Academy Sports + Outdoors opened a 1.6 million square foot distribution center in Cookeville, the largest distribution center in the state under one roof and employing 700.  Also in 2016, Spanish automotive supplier Ficosa relocated a factory and 450 jobs from nearby Crossville to a new, $58 million facility in Cookeville where it added an additional 550 jobs. The Ficosa plant produces high-tech rear-view mirrors.

Technology and research 

In 2017, Science Applications International Corp. (NYSE:SAIC) announced that it is establishing its first center of excellence to deliver information technology services in downtown Cookeville. It will be named the Technology Integration Gateway and will employ 300 information technology (IT) professionals when fully developed. Also in 2017, Scottsdale, AZ, based Digital Dream Forge opened a software testing facility in Cookeville, employing 80. In 2018, Italian tile and glass maker Colorrobia announced it would open a $5 million laboratory in Cookeville to service ceramic tile factories in the area.

Retail 

Interstate Drive, located parallel to Interstate 40 at the south end of town, is the site of many popular restaurant and hotel chains. A new 228,000 square foot retail park is now operational using the name of the Shoppes at Eagle Point just off of Interstate Drive at the intersection of South Walnut Ave. and E. Veterans Dr. Historic Downtown's West Side is the site of several locally owned retail stores and restaurants, including the Cream City ice cream and coffee shop, Ralph's Donut Shop, Crawdaddy's West Side Grill, The Backroom Bistro, World Foods, The Blue Pig, Father Tom's Pub, Seven Senses Food & Cheer, and others. Cookeville is also home to three of the region's microbreweries, the Red Silo Brewing Company, Hix Farm Brewery, and Jig Head Brewing Company.

Cookeville is considered to be Crossfit's "global mecca," with many of the world's top Crossfit Games athletes living and training together at four-time individual champion Rich Froning's CrossFit Mayhem location.

Points of interest
Tennessee Tech

 Cummins Falls State Park
 Gerald D. Coorts Memorial Arboretum
 Cookeville Depot Museum
 Cane Creek Park
 Burgess Falls State Park
 Cookeville Performing Arts Center
 Arda E. Lee's Hidden Hollow
 White Plains

Museums
 Cookeville History Museum
 Cookeville Children's Museum
 Derryberry Art Gallery
 Cumberland Art Society and Gallery
 Appalachian Center for Craft Gallery

Performing arts

 Cookeville Community Band
 Cookeville Children's Theatre
 Dogwood Outdoor Performance Pavilion
 Bryan Symphony Orchestra
 Bryan Fine Arts Center
 Mastersingers
 Cookeville Performing Arts Center
 Backdoor Playhouse
 Drama Center Backstage
 Wesley Arena Theatre
 Shakespeare in the Park
 StoryTeller Theatre and Academy
 Brown Bag Lunch Concerts

Government
The city of Cookeville operates under the council-manager form of municipal government. There is an elected five-member city council, including a mayor, vice mayor, and three city council members. The city council establishes policy that is administered by a full-time city manager. All city council members serve four year terms, and the city manager and city clerk are appointed by the city council. The current mayor is Ricky Shelton, and the four other city council members are Vice Mayor Laurin Wheaton, Dr. Charles Womack, Mark Miller, and Eric Walker. The current city manager is James Mills and the current city clerk is Darian Coons.

Cookeville is also the county seat of Putnam County. The current county mayor is Randy Porter. , the total population of Putnam County is 74,165.

Education

Cookeville is predominantly a college town, home to Tennessee Tech since 1915. Tennessee Tech is a public university with programs concentrating in science, technology, engineering, and mathematics (STEM) studies and is ranked by U.S. News & World Report as #35 on the list of the Top Regional Universities in the South, as well as the most under-rated university in the state of Tennessee. The university is rated under, "Doctoral Universities - High Research Activity (R2)" by the Carnegie classification system among schools with at least twenty (20) doctoral graduates per year. In addition to its outstanding science and engineering programs, the university is also home to the Mastersingers and the Tennessee Tech Tuba Ensemble, led by renowned professor, R. Winston Morris.

In addition to Tennessee Tech, Cookeville is also home to a satellite campus of Volunteer State Community College as well as the Tennessee Bible College, a Christian college affiliated with the Churches of Christ.

Public schools in the city of Cookeville are run by Putnam County Schools, which consists of a total of eighteen (18) elementary, middle and high schools located throughout Putnam County. The schools located in the city of Cookeville include Cookeville High School, Jere Whitson Elementary, Prescott Middle School, Northeast Elementary, Capshaw Elementary, Dry Valley School, Parkview Elementary, Sycamore Elementary, Cane Creek Elementary, Avery Trace Middle, and the Adult High School. Cookeville High School is one of the six largest public high schools in the state of Tennessee.  Cookeville High School and Avery Trace Middle School are among the twenty (20) schools in the state of Tennessee to offer the International Baccalaureate program.

Media

The major daily newspaper in Cookeville is the Herald-Citizen, which publishes in print and online formats six days per week (except Saturdays). Cookeville is also the headquarters of the Upper Cumberland Business Journal, a quarterly business newspaper serving the 14-county Upper Cumberland region. Cookeville is also home to one broadcast television station, WCTE TV 22 (PBS). Charter Communications provides cable television service, and Dish Network provides satellite television. Using cable or satellite, television stations and network affiliates from the Nashville media market can be received. Local Internet service providers include Charter Communications, Frontier Communications, and Twin Lakes Telephone Cooperative which has introduced gigabit broadband internet service in Cookeville. Cookeville's Social Media Website & App Cookeville.com.

Cookeville is also served by thirteen FM and three AM radio stations. Tennessee Tech University's campus radio indie station operates at WTTU 88.5 FM, and National Public Radio (NPR) broadcasts at WHRS 91.7 FM (simulcast with WPLN, Nashville). Rock and roll and Top 40 stations include WKSW 98.5 Kiss FM & WBXE Rock 93.7 FM, and country music can be found at WGSQ 94.7 FM Country Giant & WKXD-FM 106.9 Kicks FM. There is also one light rock station at WLQK 95.9 FM & two Christian music stations: WAYM 90.5 FM Christian Hit Radio and WWOG 90.9 FM King of Kings Radio as well as Catholic Radio station WRIM 89.9 Risen Radio. There are three talk radio stations broadcasting on both the FM and the AM dials: WPTN The Eagle 106.1 FM and AM 780 (sports), WHUB The Hub 107.7 FM and AM 1400 (news) and WUCT News Talk 94.1 FM and 1600 AM (news).

Infrastructure

Transportation

The major city streets running through the city are North Washington Ave. and South Jefferson Ave., which run north–south through the central business district, and Willow Ave., running north–south and immediately adjacent to Tennessee Tech University. In addition to Spring Street (US 70N), 10th Street runs east–west and connects North Washington Ave. with the neighboring town of Algood, and 12th Street runs east–west and connects North Washington with Willow, and leads out of town to the west, connecting with Tennessee State Route 56 (SR 56, Gainesboro Highway), via Tennessee State Route 290 (SR 290). Running east–west adjacent to I-40 in the southern section of the city is Interstate Drive, which is populated by several national restaurant chains, hotels, and other businesses.

There are no commercial passenger airports in the area, but commercial service has been studied by the Cookeville City Council as of 2022. Located in White County approximately 8.5 nautical miles (15.7 km) south of the central business district of the city is the Upper Cumberland Regional Airport , which is a small, general aviation airport serving primarily single-engine aircraft. Commercial flights are available to residents at Nashville International Airport , which is located along I-40  to the west. Airport shuttles are available for transportation to Nashville International, and the Upper Cumberland Human Resource Agency (UCHRA). UCHRA's Connect Upper Cumberland service route provides each community with daily intercity bus service on I-40 and I-24 routes into Nashville and Murfreesboro with stops along the route including the Greyhound Bus Station, airport, and other requested destinations.

Since Cookeville's founding, rail transport was a major part of the economy, and the Tennessee Central Railway connecting Nashville and Knoxville had a major rail depot in the central business district. This railway was used primarily to transport the coal and minerals of East Tennessee to the markets of the midstate region. The coal industry declined during the 1960s, and the Tennessee Central Railway was discontinued in 1968. Construction of a bicycle trail adjacent to the railway's path began in August 2013, with the reconstruction of the rail depot in Monterey. Plans are to connect this depot and the rail depot in Cookeville's central business district (now a museum) with a  bicycle trail.

Notable people

 Mack Brown – head football coach of the North Carolina Tar Heels and former head football coach of the Texas Longhorns
 Watson Brown – older brother of North Carolina Tar Heels head coach Mack Brown, former head football coach of the Rice Owls, Vanderbilt Commodores, UAB Blazers, and Tennessee Tech Golden Eagles
 Jim Carlen – former head football coach of the West Virginia Mountaineers, Texas Tech Red Raiders, and South Carolina Gamecocks
 Rich Froning Jr. – four-time individual and four-time team champion of the CrossFit Games
 Robert Ben Garant – "Deputy Junior" from the TV show Reno 911!
 Bobby Greenwood – former PGA Tour player, professional golfer
 Jake Hoot – winner of the 17th season of The Voice
 Huda Kattan – makeup artist, beauty blogger, and founder of cosmetics line Huda Beauty
 Byron (Low Tax) Looper – one-time property assessor and convicted murderer of State Senator Tommy Burks in 1998
 Harold E. Martin – a Pulitzer Prize-winning newspaperman, was the former co-owner of the Herald Citizen
 Billy Napier – head football coach of the University of Florida Gators and former head football coach of the University of Louisiana at Lafayette
 Jack Norton – children's musician and host of The Zinghoppers children's TV show that has been broadcast on Fox, NBC and PBS stations.
 Alison Piepmeier – was an American scholar and feminist, known for her book Girl Zines: Making Media, Doing Feminism. She was director of Women's and Gender Studies and associate professor of English at the College of Charleston.
 J. J. Redick – basketballer, former NBA player, last played with the Mavericks born in Cookeville, but grew up in Roanoke, Virginia.
 Elmo Stoll – a former Old Order Amish bishop, who founded of the "Christian Communities", of which the center was Cookeville.
 Trent Taylor – professional American football player for the Cincinnati Bengals and San Francisco 49ers, born in Cookeville, but moved away from town when he was two
 Lonnie Warwick – former professional football player for the Minnesota Vikings
 William Eldridge Odom – former director of the National Security Agency

References

Bibliography

External links

 Convention and Visitors Bureau

1854 establishments in Tennessee
Cities in Putnam County, Tennessee
Cities in Tennessee
Cookeville, Tennessee micropolitan area
County seats in Tennessee